The Frank Anthony Public School in Kolkata, India, is a co-educational school imparting primary, secondary and senior secondary education.

The foundation stone of the school was laid by Anglo-Indian leader, social activist and educationist Frank Anthony on 27 January 1965 with Mr. Raymonds  as its first Principal, followed by Mr. G.W.Flynn. The Frank Anthony Public School, Kolkata is one of the three Frank Anthony Public Schools started by Frank Anthony in Delhi, Bangalore and Kolkata. 

The school is under the management of the All India Anglo-Indian Education Trust. The courses of study and the scheme of work at the school are those leading to the Indian School Certificate (ISC) and the Indian Certificate of Secondary Education (ICSE) examinations. The school is located at 171 AJC Bose Road in the city of Kolkata and is open to children from all creeds and communities.

The school is presided over by Principal Ian Theodore Myers.

Terms 
There are two academic terms in the year:

 First Term (April to early September) which concludes with the Half-Yearly examinations.
 Second Term (September to early April) with the academic year culminating with Final examinations.

The school gives month long summer and winter vacations ( from mid-May to mid-June and mid-December to mid-January respectively).

See also 

 The Frank Anthony Public School, Bangalore
 The Frank Anthony Public School, New Delhi

References

External links
Fapsian Reunited (alumni website)

Primary schools in West Bengal
High schools and secondary schools in Kolkata
Educational institutions established in 1965
1965 establishments in West Bengal